The Progressive Conservative Party of Prince Edward Island held a leadership election in Charlottetown on October 2, 2010 to select a new leader after the resignation of former Premier Pat Binns on August 30, 2007 following the defeat of the party in the 2007 general election. Olive Crane was appointed interim leader on September 4, 2007 and served until June 2010 when she resigned to successfully run for leader. Jamie Ballem, Fred McCardle, Jamie Fox, and Peter Llewellyn were all also candidates for the party's leadership.

Olive Crane won the election.

Confirmed candidates
Jamie Ballem, former PC Environment Minister
Olive Crane, interim PC leader 2007–2010
Fred McCardle, former MLA for Borden-Kinkora
Peter Llewellyn, former mayor of Georgetown, PEI
Jamie Fox, former police chief

Results
The results of the leadership election was as follows.

First round

Second round

References

2010 elections in Canada
2010
2010 in Prince Edward Island
Progressive Conservative Party of Prince Edward Island leadership election